Striganoviella is a genus of beetles in the family Carabidae.

Species 
There are at least three species in this genus:
 Striganoviella janaki Bulirsch & Magrini, 2019
 Striganoviella subopaca Fedorenko, 2012
 Striganoviella vanhillei (Basilewsky, 1962)

References 

 
Carabidae genera